Wilhelmus Jacobus Duyn (31 March 1937 – 4 December 2004) was a Dutch singer, actor, and entertainer. Under the stage name Big Mouth he was co-vocalist of the Dutch pop music duos Mouth & MacNeal (1971–1974) and Big Mouth & Little Eve (1975–1977).

Career
During the 1960s Duyn was a popular musician; he had performed in many Dutch bands such as Whiskers and the Jay-Jays. He was also active as a Club DJ at various Dutch nightclubs. In 1971 music producer Hans van Hemert invited Duyn to join his new music group Mouth & MacNeal, together with Maggie MacNeal. In 1972 they had their biggest hit How Do You Do, following several successful hits the duo represented the Netherlands at the Eurovision Song Contest in Brighton, with I See a Star that finished third on the night, after 1974 Duyn and MacNeal went solo.

Duyn was also active as an actor, starring in the Dutch television programme Pompy de Robodoll and also lent his voice in voice acting. He provided the voice of King Louie in the Dutch version of The Jungle Book, Scat Cat in the Dutch version of The Aristocats and DeSoto in the Dutch version of Oliver & Company.

Death
Duyn died on 4 December 2004 after suffering a cardiac arrest. He was survived by his second wife and six children.

References

External links

Dutch cabaret performers
Eurovision Song Contest entrants for the Netherlands
Dutch male radio actors
20th-century Dutch male singers
Dutch male television actors
Dutch male voice actors
Eurovision Song Contest entrants of 1974
People from Haarlem
1937 births
2004 deaths
20th-century comedians